Adolph Cornelis Maria Hamburger (24 December 1898 – 9 February 1945) was a Dutch actor. He was active in theatre and film between 1924 and 1942. He died in the Dachau concentration camp in February 1945, only a few months before the end of the Second World War.

Selected filmography
De Familie van mijn Vrouw (1934)
Amsterdam bij nacht (1936)

References

External links

1898 births
1945 deaths
Male actors from The Hague
Dutch male stage actors
Dutch male film actors
20th-century Dutch male actors
Dutch civilians killed in World War II
Westerbork transit camp survivors
Theresienstadt Ghetto prisoners
Dutch people who died in Dachau concentration camp